The Italian Mixed Doubles Curling Championship is the national championship of mixed doubles curling (one man and one woman) in Italy. It has been held annually since the 2007–2008 season. The championships are organized by the Italian Ice-Sports Federation.

List of champions and medallists

Medal record for curlers

References

See also
Italian Men's Curling Championship
Italian Women's Curling Championship
Italian Mixed Curling Championship

Curling competitions in Italy
 
National curling championships
Recurring sporting events established in 2008
2008 establishments in Italy
Annual sporting events in Italy
Mixed doubles curling